Pecan Island is an unincorporated community with a population of about 300 located in Vermilion Parish, Louisiana, United States. It is located directly under the southern peak of White Lake and two ridges comprise the island, which are actually cheniers or "ridges of high ground" in the coast marsh. There is minimal land in the region, with the island being "an old Gulf beach, composed of crushed shells and sand".

Pecan Island is located in the prairie-marsh region of southern Louisiana, approximately ten miles from the Gulf of Mexico. The town is inhabited largely by persons of Cajun ancestry, and has a Catholic Mission church, Sacred Heart, a Baptist church and a Methodist church.  Since Hurricane Rita occurred only one store exists, which sells fuel, groceries and, hunting supplies.  Common family names in the area include Veazey, Bourque, Stelly, Guidry, Choate, Winch, Broussard, Morgan, Dyson, White, Lege, Harrington, Lee, and Miller. The town had been previously ravaged by Hurricane Audrey in 1957.

Pecan Island is part of the Abbeville Micropolitan Statistical Area.

Hurricane Rita
Most residents evacuated under the threat of Hurricane Rita, which obliterated most of the homes there and forced the closure of the community's school - Pecan Island High School. As with most Gulf coastal towns, future growth will be regulated by FEMA construction guidelines following the 2005 hurricanes, meaning new homes will be somewhat more expensive to construct, due to the increased elevation requirement.

Local events
Pecan Island has a Mardi Gras and is bustling with duck hunters in the winter months.

Morgan effigy
A carved deer antler figurine known as the "Morgan Effigy" was found in fill dirt taken from the nearby Morgan Mounds site. The location, a pre-Columbian Coastal Coles Creek culture archaeological site, was occupied between 700 and 1000 CE. The artistic stylization of the small sculpture shows it may have been a human death figure. The presence of bones in the same fill dirt means it was interred as a grave good, possibly with a prominent member of the community. It is the only known Coles Creek culture artwork to be found that is not made from ceramic.

References

External links
 Vermilion Parish Tourist Commission
 Vermilion Historical Society

Unincorporated communities in Louisiana
Unincorporated communities in Vermilion Parish, Louisiana
Acadiana